Weichelt is a German surname. Notable people with the surname include:

Friedrich Weichelt (1894–1961), German explosives engineer
Károly Weichelt (1906–1971), Romanian footballer
Stefanie Weichelt (born 1983), German footballer
Ulrike Weichelt (born 1977), German cyclist

German-language surnames